The 2020 Chattanooga Mocs football team represented the University of Tennessee at Chattanooga in the 2020–21 NCAA Division I FCS football season as a member of the Southern Conference (SoCon). The Mocs were led by second-year head coach Rusty Wright and played their home games at Finley Stadium in Chattanooga, Tennessee.

On March 29, 2021, Chattanooga announced that it would opt out of the remainder of the 2021 spring season due to safety concerns related to the COVID-19 pandemic.

Schedule
Chattanooga originally had a game scheduled against James Madison (September 12), but it was canceled on July 17 due to the CAA's decision to cancel fall sports due to the COVID-19 pandemic.

Chattanooga's game at Western Kentucky ended in controversy when the Mocs returned a kick off for a touchdown putting them ahead 16-13 with 1:09 remaining.  The touchdown was later overturned when officials claimed a fair catch had been called after review, even after video showed no fair catch called.  The result of the bad call on the part of the officials would cost Chattanooga the victory.

On October 29, Nebraska attempted to replace their game against Wisconsin game with a game against Chattanooga because Wisconsin had a mass outbreak of COVID-19. However, it was denied by Big Ten commissioner Kevin Warren.

Chattanooga's games against VMI (postponed from February 20), Western Carolina (April 3), Samford (April 10), and East Tennessee State (April 17) were canceled when Chattanooga opted out of the remainder of the spring season.

References

Chattanooga
Chattanooga Mocs football seasons
Chattanooga Mocs football